Babacar M'Bengue (born 29 October 1991) is a German professional footballer who plays as a centre back for KFC Uerdingen 05.

Career
After being promoted to the first team of MSV Duisburg in 2013, he joined SC Wiedenbrück in 2015.

In March 2021, M'Bengue agreed a move to Regionalliga West club VfB Homberg for the 2021–22 season.

References

External links
 
 
 

1991 births
Living people
German people of Senegalese descent
German footballers
Footballers from Düsseldorf
Association football defenders
MSV Duisburg players
Wuppertaler SV players
SC Wiedenbrück 2000 players
SV 19 Straelen players
Bonner SC players
VfB Homberg players
KFC Uerdingen 05 players
3. Liga players
Regionalliga players